Biohazardous is a 2001 American horror film written and directed by Michael J. Hein.  It stars Sprague Grayden as a teenager who discovers that a local research company has been creating zombies.

Plot 
A research company founded by ex-Nazi scientists moves to a small town.  Bored, several teens break in and find that the company has been reanimating the dead.  Stuck there with the zombies, they attempt to escape with the help of a few cops and employees who are also present.

Cast 
 Sprague Grayden as Laura Forman
 David Garver as Steve
 Al Thompson as Mike Walker
 Jon Avner Sgt. Murdock
 Will Dunham as Father Morris
 Matt Markey as Joe
 Katheryn Winnick as Jennifer
 Gary Ray as Hank Forman
 Michele Santopietro as Christine
 Thomas A. Cahill as Mr. Stine

Production 
Filming took place in Hillsdale, New Jersey.  The budget was less than $100,000.

Release 
Biohazardous was released on DVD in the United States on February 18, 2003.

Reception and legacy 
Drive-in film critic Joe Bob Briggs called it "a pretty much by-the-numbers, micro-budget effort".  Jerry White of Beyond Hollywood wrote that the film is enjoyably bad, as many scenes are unintentionally funny.  Daniel Benson of HorrorTalk rated it 2/5 stars and wrote that the film's special effects can not overcome the other faults, including poor writing and acting.  Writing in The Zombie Movie Encyclopedia, academic Peter Dendle said, "The filmmakers exploit the limited  location as best they can" but "there's little build-up of tension".

As an outgrowth of Biohazardous, Hein founded the New York City Horror Film Festival.

References

External links 
 

2001 films
2001 horror films
American science fiction horror films
American independent films
American zombie films
2000s English-language films
2000s American films